A crisis of faith is a deep and painful questioning, loss, or transformation of belief. Commonly, the term is used in reference to a crisis of religious faith, such as doubt about the existence or doubt about the goodness of God, but it can also be used when faith in humanity, society, an institution, or belief in an ideology are in question, and especially when an interconnected web of beliefs is challenged. It may designate an individual's internal struggle with their own faith, or an era of collective struggle.

As a literary motif the crisis of faith has been employed for thousands of years; the Book of Job is an early example. Often compared to night or winter, a crisis of faith is poetically called a "dark night of the soul," a name which is taken from a 16th-century Spanish poem. Similar to descriptions of an existential crisis or the condition melancholia, a crisis of faith often includes a loss of meaning, identity, and joy.

Experiences of misogyny and homophobia in religious institutions are characteristic of crises of faith reported during and after the 1960s. Doubt about historical or supernatural claims of a holy text was widely recorded both during and after the Victorian Crisis of Faith. A crisis of trust in religious authority or a crisis of belief in God has followed traumatic historical events such as the Armenian genocide, The Holocaust and the Rwandan genocide. Exposure to people or ideas which are outside one's own religious tradition sometimes sparks or intensifies a crisis of faith, along with disagreements which exist among believers.

An open-ended process, a crisis of faith is resolved in different ways by different people. Some people develop a reconsidered and even a strengthened faith; other people learn to accept a loss of faith. In American evangelicalism, where the refinement or rejection of beliefs is called faith deconstruction, people who are experiencing spiritual crises have reported fear of being rejected by their family and community. Though literature sometimes likens a crisis of faith to a lonely journey in a desolate landscape, its apprehensions can be interpersonal and social in nature.

Description

Professor Robert Evans of Auburn University describes a crisis of faith as a "deep and painful loss of belief in the existence of a deity or deities" or the fear of such a loss when the belief is doubted. He notes that the term can also be applied to doubts about political or ideological beliefs (such as patriotism) or it can be applied to a belief in other human beings, particularly when religious beliefs are entwined with these other beliefs. A crisis of faith can even describe a crisis of anti-religious beliefs. It can involve a rejection of the morality of the system of beliefs.

A crisis of faith includes emotional suffering, such as feelings of grief or despair, and often a loss of community of believers, resulting in loneliness. Though religious doubts are a private experience, they play out very differently in different social settings — doubt leads to crisis most often in ardently religious communities within a broader more skeptical society.

The antique medical diagnosis melancholia included characteristics today associated with a crisis of faith, though melancholia was much broader. The 1621 medical textbook The Anatomy of Melancholy describes many ways that God can be doubted, such as the riddle of why innocent people suffer in a world supposedly governed by a good god. The book catalogs religious attitudes resulting from doubt, such as polytheism, irreligion, and loving acceptance of all religious opinions. It discusses at length different types of crisis of faith and the types of suffering that can result from them, asserting that "no man is living free" from painful religious doubts.

The Varieties of Religious Experience (1902) also describes a crisis of faith in detail, and generalizes from this experience to a theory of a certain type of human nature. This account is said to be anonymous, though scholars suspect it is the experience of the author William James himself. The book describes "sick souled" individuals who are beset with intrusive thoughts about religion — the "burden of the consciousness of evil" — and who suffer from depression.

Accounts

Scholars' descriptions of the experience of a crisis of faith, including the causes perceived by those undergoing the crisis,  draw substantially on literary accounts. Below are examples grouped by primary theme or cause.

Racism, misogyny and homophobia

Starting in the 1960s Christianity in the Western world entered a crisis of declining attendance and political divisions, according to scholars, in part because of a search by women and sexual minorities for greater freedom.

As a young Christian preacher, James Baldwin found "there was no love in the church. It was a mask for hatred and self-hatred and despair." He became disillusioned with a racially segregated religion that could not accept human sexual diversity, with a god who would allow racism to exist, and with a Christian message that did not appear to improve human behavior:

Known as the Singing Nun, musician Jeanne-Paule Deckers suffered a crisis of faith because of the Catholic church's rejection of contraception, its unwillingness to support her lesbian life partnership, and the fake happiness that was forced upon her musical performances by the mother superior of her convent. Police officer Norma Jean Almodovar experienced a professional crisis and a crisis of her Baptist faith when she witnessed police corruption. Disturbed by police entrapment of women on prostitution charges, Almodovar decided to become a prostitute herself, and then an advocate for sex worker legal rights.

Exvangelicals leave the American evangelical movement frequently because of a crisis of faith sparked by racism or mistreatment of women and queer people that they witness within the church, or because of exhaustion from the continual effort required to suppress doubt and ignore information that conflicts with their religion. In particular, belief in a purity culture that casts women as gatekeepers of virginity and men as uncontrollable sexual animals has proven difficult for exvangelicals to sustain. The process of deconstructing faith has been described as terrifying and liberating, including sleepless nights spent in angst followed by a slow process of rebuilding oneself.

Exposure to new ideas or cultures

Martin Luther experienced a deep anguish that lead him to break away from the Catholic Church, writing that he hated and was angry with God. The resulting Protestant Reformation caused religious doubts throughout Europe, as Catholics and Protestants called each other's views into question. Such a crisis of faith is recorded in John Donne's poem Satire 3, in which Donne expresses pain and bewilderment at choosing between Catholic, Protestant, pagan, and atheist claims, yet he does not feel that his confusion is any excuse to stop seeking truth. Donne criticizes people who fail to question the religion they were born into. He believes it is courageous to face questions and doubts honestly, continuing the difficult search for true religion.

In the Victorian era, because of scientific discoveries conflicting with a literal reading of the Book of Genesis and the development of higher criticism of the Bible, many Victorians felt that traditional religion had come into conflict with science during their lifetimes, impacting their family relationships, friendships, and public morality. During this Victorian Crisis of Faith, novelists like William Winwood Reade and Mary Augusta Ward wrote about the struggle of replacing traditional faith with a spirituality expansive enough to accommodate new scientific discoveries. The poem "Dover Beach" expresses Matthew Arnold's disorientation over his nation's willful loss of the "sea of faith," with the outgoing tide revealing the "naked shingles of the world"

Muslim leaders in the west increasingly identify a crisis of faith and doubt in their communities, and report growth in unorthodox interpretations of religious doctrine in the 21st century. For example, a Muslim American woman reported difficulty believing in polygyny because the practice devastated her mother and does not appear to fit the world she lives in. According to researcher Simon Cotte, when Muslims leave Islam in the western context they face a double rejection — they may be disowned by their Muslim community yet marginalized by Islamophobia in their home nation.

A. K. Saran has written that Hindu belief first found itself in crisis when it encountered Islam. Because the Hindu and Muslim belief systems both claim to be a complete description of the universe they are in conflict in way that did not arise during Hinduism's prior contact with Buddhism. This competition eroded the possibility of finding meaning (mukti) in life by conforming to the Hindu sacred social order. Only people living isolated or detached lives, such as monks, could retain an uncomplicated faith according to Saran. Similar challenges were posed by Christianity and ultimately by modern technological, secular society. Saran says Hinduism has reacted to the modern loss of meaning with fundamentalism, "sentimental revivalism," politicization of religion, and by attacking Islam as a scapegoat.

Philosophical problems

Questions or problems posed by philosophers such as the problem of evil and Euthyphro dilemma or broad topics like human mortality and the meaning of life are cited in personal records of crises of faith such as A Confession by Leo Tolstoy, and in fiction such as The Grand Inquisitor by Fyodor Dostoevsky.

Hypocrisy

The kind of people most attracted to religion are depicted as hypocrites in the fiction of Nathaniel Hawthorne. Religious leaders in his stories misuse human religious impulses to protect their own power. Hawthorne's 1835 story Young Goodman Brown depicts an acute crisis of faith. The main character comes to suspect that the tight-knit Puritan community in which he grew up is filled with sinners and criminals, and that his own ancestors massacred indigenous people and tortured a Quaker woman. He loses the ability to trust his community, his church, his wife (symbolically named Faith) and even his own perceptions.

Abuse

Sexual abuse by a religious authority, according to Richard Gartner, can create "a crisis of faith arising from a sense that one has betrayed God."

Catholic Church sexual abuse cases resulted in a crisis of faith in individuals interviewed by The Washington Post in 2018, including an unwillingness to pass the faith along to children. About one quarter of ex-Catholics cited sexual abuse by clergy as a reason for leaving the church.

James Carroll, who served as Catholic chaplain at Boston University from 1969 to 1974, describes in his book The Truth at the Heart of the Lie his painful spiritual reactions to the revelations of sexual abuse within the Catholic church:Speaking for myself, I never knew until now what the hackneyed phrase "crisis of faith" referred to. Now, with my thinking upended and my feelings in turmoil, I am forced to ask questions that are as urgent to me today as they were urgently avoided all my life: What does it mean that for five years I myself was a priest? Seeing much of the priesthood for what it has become, how could I have embraced it as my life's project? What does it mean that, theologically, the "ontological change" claptrap still applies to me? What does it mean that for fifty years I have preserved my reverence for the priest as an uncriticized ground of significance? And why should my distress not be edged with the dreadful knowledge that I have somehow been complicit?

Jeanna Kadlec has written of the religious trauma that became clear to her during her crisis of faith, which she considers representative of many traumatic experiences among those who leave fundamentalism.

Genocide

After the mass killings of the second world war, Holocaust theology had to contend with a god who apparently allowed or caused such devastation and the resulting widespread crisis of faith. Professor Richard L. Rubenstein argued that God should be considered dead, leaving humans to create their own meaning in life. Elie Wiesel recorded his experience in Nazi concentration camps, becoming a resentful teenage caregiver during his father's decline into helplessness, losing his faith in human relationships and his faith in God. Wiesel witnessed mass murder of children on his first night in the camp, and he felt that his entire subsequent life was a continuation of the same horrifying, unending night:

Leaders of the Catholic Church in Rwanda, including archbishop Vincent Nsengiyumva, did not stand in the way of Hutus who murdered up to 1 million people during the 1994 Rwandan genocide, including thousands of victims hiding inside of church buildings as a place of refuge. The United Nations believes that Catholic priests participated in the killings. Many Rwandans refused to return to worship services. Reporters spoke to Rwandans who lost conviction in the church because they saw that church-going people were fully capable of great evil.

Epidemic

Liberians faced a crisis of faith during the Ebola virus epidemic in Liberia from 2014 to 2015. Pentecostal churches denied the existence of the disease, leading to increased death. The Liberia Council of Churches called ebola divine punishment for homosexuality and government corruption. The seemingly capricious nature of the disease and religious authorities' helplessness called divine justice into question, according to New York Times interviews with Liberians.

God's indifference

The Book of Job is an ancient and well-known account of a crisis of faith. In this book, Job is a wealthy and god-fearing man; God tests Job's faith by allowing Job's wealth to be taken away, his family killed, and his body to become covered in boils. Job feels betrayed by God, observing that God is a tyrant who creates and destroys whole nations without reason, withholding wisdom from human leaders, condemning them to metaphorically wander aimlessly in a deserted wasteland. Though Job questions God's justice and mercy he never seems to doubt the existence of God.

Outcomes

Reshaped faith

A crisis of faith can lead a person to refine their belief, excising or modifying parts of it they don't accept. For example, rejecting male control of Victorian-era Christian institutions, Julia Wedgewood and Ellice Hopkins were each motivated by a personal crisis of faith to write feminist Christian theology.

Apostasy

Sociologist Phil Zuckerman writes that faith is a deliberate act. When social structures are in place that make faith seem plausible, such as when one is surrounded by like-minded believers, then faith may feel "taken for granted." When these supportive structures are not in place a crisis of faith is more likely to result in a loss of faith — apostasy — because the effort to maintain faith is more burdensome. Zuckerman observed apostasy sparked by seeing a religious leader cheating on his wife, religious opposition to Dungeons & Dragons, and by the book Why I Am Not a Christian, among other causes. Apostasy is a particularly high-stakes, socially dramatic event in highly religious societies or in fundamentalist communities.

Nihilism

A crisis of interlocking beliefs can end in the conclusion that none of the beliefs are justified, for example concluding that human values are baseless or that life has no inherent meaning. Charles Glicksburg identifies this nihilism and loss of "faith in the possibility of faith" as characteristic of a crisis of faith experienced by may individual intellectuals in the 19th and 20th centuries. Glicksburg says this renunciation of meaning can surprisingly become "a celebration of the mystery of life."

Robert Evans gives this passage from the 1933 short story A Clean, Well-Lighted Place as distinctive of dying faith replaced with nothingness. The passage is the musing of a waiter who is preoccupied with the idea that life might mean nothing, considering an old man who has attempted suicide because of his isolation. The author, Ernest Hemmingway, mixes the Spanish word for nothing (nada) into Christian prayer:
 

In After Auschwitz, Richard Rubenstein writes of a crisis of his Reform Judaism and his optimism about humankind upon leaning of the Nazi death camps. He turned toward a traditional form of Judaism articulated by Isaac Luria and Shneur Zalman of Liadi centered on human suffering  and mystical nihilism, concluding "omnipotent Nothingness is Lord of All Creation"

Freedom

Søren Kierkegaard wrote that people experience the "dizziness of freedom" during a crisis of faith, feeling angst because of freedom of choice that is both appealing and terrifying. If one accepts this freedom, one can then make a leap of faith that is freely chosen. For example, exvangelical scholar Andrew F. Herrmann reports that, after exploring his faith, stripping it "down to the bare bones" and suffering the dizziness of freedom, he re-built himself and his faith by asking "What, at a minimum, must I believe to still believe?" This can result in a strengthened, more secure faith.

People who abandon, rather than re-build, their faith also report an experience of freedom. They gain the freedom to think, read, and discuss whatever they want without fear of divine punishment or of disappointing religious leaders. Like some who re-build faith on their own terms, apostates also gain the freedom to seek their own sense of morality and to cherish values like kindness and justice in a freely-chosen way.

References

Notes

Citations

Sources

Further reading 

 
 

Crisis
Personal life
Philosophy of life
Suffering
Theology
Mysticism